The Henry Cow Box Redux: The Complete Henry Cow (subtitled 50th Anniversary Box) is a seventeen-CD plus one-DVD box set by English avant-rock group Henry Cow; it was released by RēR Megacorp in November 2019. The box set comprises the previously released 2006 Henry Cow Box (excluding the bonus CD-single: "Unreleased Orckestra Extract") and the 2009 40th Anniversary Henry Cow Box Set (including the bonus CD: A Cow Cabinet of Curiosities), totalling over sixteen hours. A bonus CD: Ex Box – Collected Fragments 1971–1978 was given to advance subscribers of the 2019 Box Redux, and contains newly recovered and previously unreleased recordings, plus the contents of the 2006 box set bonus CD-single: "Unreleased Orckestra Extract". The 2019 Box Redux plus the Ex Box bonus CD contains all the officially released studio and live recordings of Henry Cow, excluding "Bellycan" as released on the 1991 East Side Digital version of Legend, and the complete version of "The Glove" from the 1991 East Side Digital version of Unrest.

The Henry Cow Box Redux was released to coincide with the 50th anniversary of the formation of Henry Cow. Included in the box set are three 60-page booklets: Book 1: The Studio Volumes 1–7; Book 2: The Road Volumes 8–12; and Book 3: The Road Volumes 13–17. All the studio CDs were remastered by Bob Drake. RēR Megacorp also released the Ex Box bonus CD as a free-standing album.

In December 2022, a supplemental CD was released, Volume 20: Glastonbury and Elsewhere containing unreleased material uncovered after the release of the Redux box set in 2019.

Reception
A review of The Henry Cow Box Redux: The Complete Henry Cow in Moors Magazine called Henry Cow "one of the most fascinating and best British bands ever". It described their music as having "the mentality of free jazz and the discipline of the intelligent rock of Zappa". It was always "exciting" and "surprising" music and just as relevant today as it was 50 years ago. The reviewer concluded that "[t]his box is an absolute must for lovers of intelligent jazz rock."

Reviewing the box set in the British progressive rock magazine, Prog, Mike Barnes called Henry Cow "one of the most exploratory groups of the 70s". He praised their studio albums in the box, from the "dazzling" Canterbury-influenced debut, Legend, to the "concise, chamber ensemble feel" of Western Culture. The remainder of the collection, their live recordings, completes the Henry Cow story. He said the band's improvisations were "rare in progressive rock", but felt that while much of their music was "extraordinary", not all of it worked. For example, Barnes described the Trondheim concert as "desultory instrumental conversations", and Tim Hodgkinson's "severe, serialist 16-minute" "Erk Gah" on the DVD in Verey "a very tough nut to crack". But Barnes complemented the performance in Bremen of Fred Frith's "New Suite", and the concert in Halsteren where the band played with themes from Hodgkinson's "Living in the Heart of the Beast".

Roger Trenwith wrote in The Progressive Aspect that this box set "messes with your preconceptions of compositional construction and recording techniques". He said Henry Cow's music "is not ... easy listening", but it is "hugely imaginative, often intentionally humorous, more than occasionally terrifying, and always interesting". He complimented Bob Drake on his remastering of the band's studio albums, adding that their "clarity ... is stunning". Trenwith stated that Henry Cow's studio work illustrates how varied their music was and how it progressed from one album to the next. He called In Praise of Learning "frighteningly good", but felt that Western Culture was "an academic exercise [that] is quite satisfying, but ... lack[ing] something". Of the live recordings, Trenwith listed the Bremen CD as the highlight, with its "thrilling display of quality chamber rock" in "New Suite", and the "Der Kunst Der Orgel" improvisation that he felt is "less ethereal, and ... more involving" than the Trondheim set. Trenwith concluded that the three booklets are full of interesting material and "are worthy of a review themselves".

Contents
Source: Box set and Bonus CD liner notes.

Volume 1: Leg End

Track list

Track notes
Leg End was originally released on LP in 1973 as The Henry Cow Legend
In the box set liner notes, "Teenbeat" is incorrectly credited to Henry Cow
In the box set liner notes, "Extract from 'With the Yellow Half-Moon and Blue Star" is incorrectly credited to Frith and Greaves
The bonus track "Bellycan" that appears on the 1991 East Side Digital CD release of Legend is an extract/out-take from Henry Cow's 1973 set on Greasy Truckers Live at Dingwalls Dance Hall, which is included in Volume 6–7: Concerts

Volume 2: Unrest

Track list

Track notes
The bonus tracks "The Glove" and "Torch Fire" that appear on the 1991 East Side Digital CD release of Unrest are included on the Cow Cabinet of Curiosities and Ex Box – Collected Fragments 1971–1978 bonus CDs respectively, although only an excerpted version of "The Glove" is included.

Volume 3: Desperate Straights

Track list

Track notes
In the box set liner notes "Excerpt from The Messiah" is credited to Handel and Blegvad

Volume 4: In Praise of Learning

Track list

Track notes
On the LP and CD releases of In Praise of Learning, "Beginning: The Long March" and "Morning Star" are credited to Henry Cow and Slapp Happy
The bonus track "Lovers of Gold" that appears on the 1991 East Side Digital CD release of In Praise of Learning is included on the Cow Cabinet of Curiosities bonus CD

Volume 5: Western Culture

Track list

Track notes
The bonus tracks "Viva Pa Ubu", "Look Back (alt)" and "Slice" that appear on the CD releases of Western Culture are included on the Ex Box – Collected Fragments 1971–1978 bonus CD

Volume 6 and 7: Concerts

Track list

Volume 8: Beginnings

Track list

Volume 9: 1974–5

Track list

{{tracklist
| title_width = 30em
| writing_width = 36em
| headline = Living in the Heart of the Beast
| title24 = Living in the Heart of the Beast"
"Part 1"
"Part 2"
"Part 3"
"Part 4"
"Part 5"
"Part 6"
"Part 7"
"Part 8"
"Part 9
| writer24 = Hodgkinson
| length24 = 13:46
| total_length = 60:21
}}

Volume 10: Hamburg

Track list

Volume 11–12: Trondheim

Track list
{{tracklist
| title_width = 30em
| writing_width = 36em
| headline  = Trondheim 1
| title1 = Trondheim I"
"Part 1"
"Part 2"
"Part 3"
"Part 4"
"Part 5"
"Part 6"
"Part 7"
"Part 8"
"Part 9"
"Part 10
| writer1 = Lindsay Cooper, Chris Cutler, Fred Frith, Tim Hodgkinson
| length1 = 48:25
| total_length = 48:25
}}
{{tracklist
| title_width = 30em
| writing_width = 36em
| headline  = Trondheim 2
| title1 = Trondheim II"
"Part 1"
"Part 2"
"Part 3"
"Part 4"
"Part 5"
"Part 6
| writer1 = Cooper, Cutler, Frith, Hodgkinson
| length1 = 31:54
| title7 = The March
| writer7 = Frith arr. Henry Cow
| length7 = 6:25
| total_length = 38:19
}}

Volume 13: Stockholm & Göteborg

Track list
{{tracklist
| title_width = 30em
| writing_width = 36em
| title1 = Stockholm 1
| writer1 = Georgina Born, Lindsay Cooper, Chris Cutler, Fred Frith, Tim Hodgkinson
| length1 = 6:38
| title2 = Erk Gah"
"Part 1"
"Part 2"
"Part 3"
"Part 4"
"Part 5
| writer2 = Hodgkinson
| length2 = 16:46

| title7 = A Bridge to Ruins
| writer7 = Hodgkinson
| length7 = 5:08
| title8 = Ottawa Song
| writer8 = Cutler, Frith
| length8 = 3:27
| title9 = Göteborg 1"
"Part 1"
"Part 2"
"Part 3
| writer9 = Cooper, Cutler, Frith, John Greaves, Hodgkinson
| length9 = 16:53

| title12 = No More Songs
| writer12 = Phil Ochs arr. Frith
| length12 = 3:35
| title13 = Stockholm 2
| writer13 = Born, Cooper, Cutler, Frith, Hodgkinson, Dagmar Krause
| length13 = 6:13
| title14 = March
| writer14 = Frith
| length14 = 4:15
| total_length = 63:23
}}

Track notes
The CD track listing incorrectly credits Greaves as appearing on "Göteborg 1"; this error is noted in the liner notes (see Stockholm & Göteborg for details)

Volume 14: Later and Post-Virgin

Track list

Volume 15: Bremen

Track list

{{tracklist
| title_width = 30em
| writing_width = 36em
| headline = Die Kunst Der Orgel
| title8 = Bremen"
"Part 1"
"Part 2"
"Part 3"
"Part 4"
"Part 5
| writer8 = Born, Cooper, Cutler, Frith, Hodgkinson
| length8 = 34:25
| title13 = Erk Gah instrumental extract"
13"Part 1"
14"Part 2
| writer13 = Hodgkinson
| length13 = 13:04
| total_length = 74:07
}}

Volume 16: Late

Track list
{{tracklist
| title_width = 30em
| writing_width = 36em
| title1 = Joy of Sax
| writer1 = 
| length1 = 3:50
| title2 = Jackie-ing
| writer2 = Thelonious Monk arr. Mike Westbrook
| length2 = 1:15
| title3 = Untitled 2
| writer3 = Lindsay Cooper
| length3 = 1:32
| title4 = The Herring People
| writer4 = Fred Frith
| length4 = 2:07
| title5 = RIO"
"Part 1"
"Part 2"
"Part 3"
"Part 4
| writer5 = Georgina Born, Cooper, Chris Cutler, Frith, Tim Hodgkinson
| length5 = 17:09
| title9 = Half the Sky
| writer9 = Cooper
| length9 = 5:05
| title10 = Virgins of Illinois
| writer10 = trad.
| length10 = 2:13
| title11 = Viva Pa Ubu
| writer11 = Hodgkinson
| length11 = 2:18
| total_length = 35:33
}}

Volume 17: Vevey (DVD)

Track list

Volume 18: A Cow Cabinet of Curiosities

Track list

Bonus CD: Ex Box – Collected Fragments 1971–1978

This is a 250-copy limited edition CD given to subscribers of the Box Redux, although RēR Megacorp also sold the disk as a free-standing album. The CD was compiled by Chris Cutler and mastered by Bob Drake at Studio Midi-Pyrenees in France in October 2019. It comprises previously unreleased recordings, bonus tracks that appeared on reissues of some of Henry Cow's studio albums, plus the two tracks by the Orckestra that were released on the bonus CD-single, "Unreleased Orckestra Extract" that was given to subscribers of the 2006 Henry Cow Box.

Track list

Personnel
Georgie Born – bass guitar (tracks 10–17), cello (tracks 14, 16)
Lindsay Cooper – bassoon, sopranino saxophone (tracks 2, 4–17), piano (tracks 8–9), voice (track 12)
Chris Cutler – drums, flageolet, electrification (tracks 2–17), xylophone (track 9)
Sean Jenkins – drums (track 1)
Fred Frith – electric and acoustic guitar (all tracks), viola (track 17), voice (tracks 3, 12)
John Greaves – bass guitar (tracks 1–7), voice (track 3)
Tim Hodgkinson – alto saxophone, organ (all tracks), voice (tracks 3, 8, 12)
Dagmar Krause – voice (tracks 11–12)
Geoff Leigh – tenor saxophone (tracks 2–3), flute, voice (track 3)
Kate Westbrook – euphonium (tracks 10–11)
Mike Westbrook – piano (tracks 10–11)
Dave Chambers – soprano saxophone (tracks 10–11)
Paul Rutherford – trombone (tracks 10–11)
Phil Minton – voice, trumpet (tracks 10–11)
Frankie Armstrong – voice (tracks 10–11)

Production
Chris Cutler – compilation
Bob Drake – mastering
Tim Schwartz – design

Track notes
Source: Bonus CD liner notes.
Track 1: A demo recorded in 1971 in Cambridge and features Henry Cow's second drummer, Sean Jenkins; it was sent to John Peel's Rockertunity Knocks competition, which resulted in the composition being performed by Henry Cow on the John Peel Show on 4 May 1971 in London; this demo is the only recording of the piece remaining as the John Peel recording was destroyed.
Tracks 2–3: Remixed versions of "Amygdala" (with Cooper playing bassoon) and "Nine Funerals of the Citizen King" from Henry Cow's first album, Legend by Hodgkinson at Cold Storage Studios in London in 1990; previously released in 1991 on the East Side Digital CD reissue of Legend.
Tracks 4–7: Taken from a cassette recording of a concert at the Theatre Royal in Sheffield on 9 June 1974 while on tour with Captain Beefheart; "Free" is a bridge, while "Fugue" is an extract from Frith's "With the Yellow Half-Moon and Blue Star".
Track 8: Taken from a cassette recording made during Henry Cow's May 1976 tour of Scandinavia where as a quartet of Cooper, Cutler, Frith and Hodgkinson they improvised their performance in the dark; another recording from the tour in Trondheim was released in The 40th Anniversary Henry Cow Box Set#Volume 4–5: Trondheim.
Track 9: An outtake from recordings for side two of Unrest; previously released as a bonus track in 1991 on the East Side Digital's CD reissue of Unrest.
Tracks 10–11: Taken from a cassette recording of an Orckestra concert in Europe in March–May 1978; previously released on a bonus mini-CD, "Unreleased Orckestra Extract" that was given to subscribers of the 2006 Henry Cow Box.
Tracks 12–14: Outtakes from Henry Cow's recordings at Sunrise Studios in Kirchberg, Switzerland in January 1978 ("Viva Pa Ubu") and July–August 1978 ("Slice", "Look Back, Alt Version"); previously released in 2001 and 2002 on the Recommend and East Side Digital CD reissues of Western Culture respectively.
Tracks 15–17: Taken from a cassette recording of a concert at the Teatro Olimpico in Parma, Italy on 20 February 1977.

Volume 20: Glastonbury and Elsewhere

Released in December 2022 as a supplement to The Henry Cow Box Redux, it contains additional unreleased material uncovered after the release of the box set in 2019. Cutler stated in the liner notes that these recordings "are not hi fidelity", but in some instances are the only surviving recordings to feature these Henry Cow lineups".

Glastonbury and Elsewhere was released in two forms, as a standalone digipak, and in a sleeve designed to fit into the Redux box.

Track list

Personnel
Source: Box set liner notes.
Tim Hodgkinson – saxophone (track 1), alto saxophone (tracks 2–5), organ (tracks 1–3, 5), tapes (tracks 3, 5)
Fred Frith – electric guitar (tracks 1–5), bass guitar (track 4), tapes (tracks 3, 5), viola (track 4), xylophone (track 4)
Georgie Born – bass guitar (tracks 3, 5), cello (track 5)
John Greaves – bass guitar (tracks 1–2)
Lindsay Cooper – bassoon (tracks 3, 5), recorder (tracks 3, 5), oboe (track 2), tapes (tracks 3, 5)
Chris Cutler – drums (tracks 2–5), liner notes
Martin Ditcham – drums (track 1)
Phil Minton – voice (track 4), trumpet (track 4)

Track notes
Source: Box set liner notes.
Track 1: Recorded live by John Lundsten at the Glastonbury Fayre in June 1971; the earliest and only known live recording of the Henry Cow lineup at the time (Martin Ditcham, Fred Frith, John Greaves and Tim Hodgkinson)
Track 2: Recorded at The Manor, Oxfordshire in 1973; extract of a studio session recorded by a film crew
Track 3: Recorded live at Chaumont, Salles de Fetes, France in November 1976; additional extracts from this concert (see Volume 14: Later and Post-Virgin)
Track 4: Recorded live somewhere in France in April 1978 with Phil Minton; Minton had joined Frith, Hodgkinson and Cutler (all that remained of Henry Cow at the time), and calling themselves "The Lions of Desire", they performed in Spain and France in April 1978; includes extracts from "Ruins", "Mourn not the Dead", "Lady Howard's Coach, and "Virgin of Illinois"
Track 5: Recorded live in Bilbao, Teatro S. Vincente, Spain in November 1977; includes extracts from "Teenbeat", an untitled Frith composition, and "Jackie-ing"

Box artwork
Graphic design – Tim Schwartz
Bus photo – Sula Goschen
"Henry Cow" lettering – derived from the "Henry Cow" lettering used in a 1973 newspaper advert created by Ray Smith for Legend

Footnotes

References

Works cited

External links

Henry Cow lyrics. Calyx: The Canterbury Website

2019 compilation albums
Henry Cow albums
Recommended Records albums
Recommended Records live albums
Recommended Records compilation albums
Live free improvisation albums